Commerson's dolphin (Cephalorhynchus commersonii), also referred to by the common names jacobita, skunk dolphin, piebald dolphin, panda dolphin, or tonina overa (in South America), is a small oceanic dolphin of the genus Cephalorhynchus. Commerson's dolphin has two geographically-isolated but locally-common subspecies. The principal subspecies, C.c.commersonii, has sharply-delineated black-and-white patterning and is found around the tip of South America. The secondary subspecies, C.c.kerguelenensis, is larger than C.c.commersonii, has a less-sharply delineated dark and light grey patterning with a white ventral band, and is found around the Kerguelen Islands in the Indian Ocean.

The dolphin is named after French naturalist Dr Philibert Commerson, who first described them in 1767 after sighting them in the Strait of Magellan.

Population and distribution
Global populations are unknown, but the species is accepted to be locally common.

The main subspecies, C.c.commersonii, is found inshore in various inlets in Argentina including Puerto Deseado, in the Strait of Magellan and around Tierra del Fuego, and near the Falkland Islands (Las Malvinas). A survey in 1984 estimated there to be 3,200 individuals in the Strait of Magellan. 

Dolphins of the second subspecies, C.c.kerguelenensis, were discovered in the 1950s. They reside near the Kerguelen Islands in the southern part of the Indian Ocean, and prefer shallow waters.

Though the Kerguelen Islands are closer, such a journey would require swimming against the Antarctic Circumpolar Current.

Description

C.c.commersonii

The commersonii subspecies has a black head, dorsal fin, and fluke, with a white throat and body. The demarcation between the two colours is very clear-cut. This stocky creature is one of the smallest of all cetaceans, growing to around 1.5 m (5 ft). A mature female caught off of southern Patagonia, at 23 kg (51 lb) and 1.36 m (4.5 ft), may be the smallest adult cetacean on record. Its appearance resembles that of a porpoise, but its conspicuous behaviour is typical of a dolphin. The dorsal fin has a long, straight leading edge which ends in a curved tip. The trailing edge is typically concave, but not falcate. The fluke has a notch in the middle.

Sexes are easily distinguished by the different shape of the black blotch on the belly — it is shaped like a teardrop in males but is more rounded in females. Females reach breeding age at six to 9 years. Males reach sexual maturity at about the same age. Mating occurs in the spring and summer and calving occurs after a gestation period of 11 months during the spring and summer. The Commerson's dolphin has been known to live up to eighteen years in the wild, while in captivity the oldest individual was at least 33 years old at the time of death.

C.c.kerguelenensis
Dolphins of the kerguelenensis subspecies tend to be larger than those of C.c.commersonii, and differ in patterning in that they are dark grey instead of black, and light grey instead of white, except ventrally. The demarcation between areas of the pattern is also less clearly demarcated.

Behavior
Commerson's dolphin is very active. It is often seen swimming rapidly on the surface and leaping from the water. It also spins and twists as it swims and may surf on breaking waves when very close to the shore. It will bow-ride and swim behind fast-moving boats. It is also known to swim upside-down, which is thought to improve the visibility of its prey.

This dolphin feeds on a mix of coastal and pelagic fish and squid. Those in the South American subpopulation supplement their diets with crustaceans. Individuals have been recorded as entering the Santa Cruz River to forage there during low tide.

They can be found in estuaries, especially during the breeding season.

Conservation
The IUCN lists Commerson's dolphin as Least Concern in its Red List of Threatened Species. The proximity of the dolphin to the shore makes accidental killing in gillnets a common occurrence. The dolphin was killed for use as crab bait by some Argentinian and Chilean fishermen in the 1970s and 1980s, but this practice has since been curtailed.

The Commerson's dolphin population of South America is listed on Appendix II of the Convention on the Conservation of Migratory Species of Wild Animals (CMS). It is listed on Appendix II as it has an unfavourable conservation status or would benefit significantly from international co-operation organised by tailored agreements.

Captivity
These dolphins have been known to be displayed in a few aquariums.

See also

List of cetaceans

References

National Audubon Society: Guide to Marine Mammals of the World 
Encyclopedia of Marine Mammals 
The Sierra Club Handbook of Whales and Dolphins

External links

Heaveside's dolphin
Mammals of Argentina
Mammals of Chile
Marine fauna of South America
Cetaceans of the Atlantic Ocean
Cetaceans of the Indian Ocean
Fauna of Patagonia
Fauna of Tierra del Fuego
Fauna of the Kerguelen Islands
Fauna of Temperate South America
Commerson's dolphin
Commerson's dolphin